Jean Yves de Blasiis (born 25 September 1973 in Bordeaux) is a French former professional footballer.

De Blasiis, a midfielder, began his career with his hometown club FC Girondins de Bordeaux where he won the 1995 UEFA Intertoto Cup. He then moved to Stade Malherbe Caen and then Red Star Paris. In the summer of 1999, Norwich City manager Bruce Rioch signed him on a Bosman free transfer. After a promising start, his spell at Norwich was wrecked by a cruciate ligament injury and the club released him the summer of 2001. He returned to France where he played for his former club Bordeaux and FC Istres.

He is now part of the coaching staff at Bordeaux.

References

External links
 Career information at ex-canaries.co.uk
 
 Jean-Yves de Blasiis Interview

Sources
Canary Citizens by Mark Davage, John Eastwood, Kevin Platt, published by Jarrold Publishing, (2001), 

1973 births
Living people
Footballers from Bordeaux
Association football midfielders
French footballers
Ligue 1 players
FC Girondins de Bordeaux players
Stade Malherbe Caen players
Red Star F.C. players
Norwich City F.C. players
FC Istres players